The 1951 Tour de Romandie was the fifth edition of the Tour de Romandie cycle race and was held from 3 May to 6 May 1951. The race started and finished in Fribourg. The race was won by Ferdinand Kübler.

General classification

References

1951
Tour de Romandie